Johnny Mack Morrow (born November 25, 1942, in Vina, Al) is an American Democratic politician. From 1990 to 2018, he was a member of the Alabama House of Representatives for the 18th district. He resides in Red Bay, Alabama.

References

Living people
Democratic Party members of the Alabama House of Representatives
1942 births
21st-century American politicians